Bianchini is an Italian surname. Notable people with the surname include:

 Angela Bianchini (1921–2018), Italian fiction writer and literary critic
 Brian Bianchini (1978–2004), American male model
 Francesco Bianchini (1662–1729), Italian philosopher and scientist, after whom Bianchini (lunar crater) and Bianchini (Martian crater) are named
 Frank Bianchini (born 1961), American football player
 Federico Bianchi (painter) (1635-1719), Italian Baroque painter
 Federico Bianchi (soccer) (born 1983), American former professional soccer player
 Gina Bianchini, founder of the Ning social networking platform
 Giovanni Bianchini (1410–c. 1449), Italian astronomer
 Giuseppe Bianchini (1704–1764), Italian Oratorian, biblical, historical, and liturgical scholar
 Leslie Bianchini (born 1947), Playboy magazine Playmate of the Month
 Lorenzo Bianchini (born 1989), Italian professional football player
 Orlando Bianchini (born 1955), Italian hammer thrower
 Stefano Bianchini (born 1970), Italian mathematician
 Vincenzo Bianchini (1903–2000) Italian artist
 Victor Bianchini (born 1938), American Judge, Veteran, Fencing Champion

Italian-language surnames